Pleospora betae is a plant pathogen infecting beet. It contains the chemical substances betaenone A, B and C. Pleospora betae develops on dead beet residues and is a marsupial stage of the Phoma betae anamorph, parasitizing on beets and causing a number of harmful diseases.

References

Fungal plant pathogens and diseases
Food plant pathogens and diseases
Pleosporaceae
Fungi described in 1877